August Fools is a 2013 comedy film directed by Taru Mäkelä. It is a Finnish-Czech co-production set in Helsinki, Finland in the early 1960s.

Main cast 

Kati Outinen
Esko Salminen
Elena Leeve
Laura Birn
Tapio Liinoja
Vesa Vierikko
Pirkka-Pekka Petelius
Miroslav Etzler
Aku Hirviniemi

References

External links

2013 films
Films directed by Taru Mäkelä
Czech romantic comedy films
Finnish romantic comedy films
2013 romantic comedy films
2013 multilingual films
Czech multilingual films
Finnish multilingual films